The Hindenburg light or Hindenburglicht, was a source of tallow lighting used in the trenches of the First World War, named after the Commander-in-Chief of the German army in World War I, Paul von Hindenburg. This flat bowl was filled with a wax-like fat (tallow). A short wick (Docht) in the center was lit and burned for some hours. A later model of the Hindenburglicht was a "tin can (Dosenlicht) lamp." Here, a wax-filled tin can have two wicks in a holder. If both wicks are lit, a common, broad flame (zungenfoermige Flamme) results.

The lights were also used in World War II in air raid shelters (Luftschutzkeller) or during power cuts, and mandated black outs as emergency lighting.

The Hindenburg light is mentioned in the novels , "Die Entdeckung der Currywurst" by Uwe Timm and Berlin by Theodore Plievier, as used on the Eastern Front and in air raid shelters respectively. Also it is mentioned in Wheels of Terror by Sven Hassel and In Deadly Combat A German Soldier's Memoir of the Eastern Front by Gottlob Herbert Biedermann.

See also 
 Tealight

References

Lighting
World War I military equipment of Germany
World War II military equipment of Germany